Nandgaon (Assembly constituency) - नांदगाव (विधानसभा मतदारसंघ) is one of the fifteen constituencies of the Maharashtra Vidhan Sabha located in the Nashik district.

Overview
It is a part of the Dindori (Lok Sabha constituency)(ST) along with five other assembly constituencies, viz Chandwad Assembly constituency, Dindori, Kalvan, Niphad Assembly constituency and Yeola Assembly constituency .

Members of Legislative Assembly

Election results

Assembly Elections 2004

Assembly Elections 2009

Assembly Elections 2014

See also
Nandgaon (disambiguation)

References

Assembly constituencies of Nashik district
Assembly constituencies of Maharashtra